Musa is a crater in the northern hemisphere of Saturn's moon Enceladus.  Musa was first seen in Voyager 2 images.  It is located at 72.4° North Latitude, 17.6° West Longitude and is 25 kilometers across. Musa is located North of Aladdin.  A large, dome-like structure occupies the interior of the crater, suggesting the crater has undergone significant viscous relaxation.  From Voyager 2 images, it also appears that Musa is superimposed on an older crater that formed just to the south.

Musa is named after a character from Arabian Nights.  He goes to get the vessels that contain Jinni in "The City of Brass".

References

Impact craters on Enceladus